The 1976 Grand National (officially known as the  News of the World Grand National for sponsorship reasons) was the 130th renewal of the Grand National horse race that took place at Aintree near Liverpool, England, on 3 April 1976. The race was won by Rag Trade, who was the fourth winner trained by Fred Rimell and the second winner owned by Pierre Raymond Bessone. Red Rum finished second for the second year in a row. Rimell's fourth winner gave him the outright record for training most National winners which he had previously shared with six other trainers. His record was equalled by Ginger McCain in 2004.

Finishing order

Non-finishers

Media coverage and aftermath
For the 17th consecutive year the BBC broadcast the Grand National in a Grandstand special, presented by David Coleman.
In an interview eleven years after the race, Red Rum's trainer, Ginger McCain, expressed that he felt jockey Tommy Stack had made a tactical error in waiting until the penultimate flight before attempting to race to the finish as is, McCain noted, the textbook way to ride a National. He instead felt that if Stack had allowed Red Rum to "kick on from the fifth last flight he would have stretched his rivals and outpaced them". McCain was also quick to point out how much easier it is to ride the Grand National in your head from the stands and praised his rider for a "marvelous effort" The tactics described by McCain turned out to be those employed by Stack in 1977 when the horse won a record breaking third Grand National.

References

Sources

 1976
Grand National
Grand National
Grand National
20th century in Merseyside